All Years Leaving is the debut album by English band the Stands, released in 2004. The album was produced by frontman Howie Payne and reached 28 on the UK Albums Chart. Four singles were released from the album, one reaching the UK top 30 and two reaching the top 40.

Critical reception
The Guardian praised the album's "spiralling pyschedelia and timeless melodies."  The Press wrote that the band "have that Liverpool knack of making melodies instantly familiar yet somehow not too familiar, while the band sounds as if they have been playing together, easy, gentle and harmonious, since birth."

Track listing
All songs written by Howie Payne.

"I've Waited So Long" – 2:47 
"All Years Leaving" – 3:44 
"Outside Your Door" – 2:45
"When This River Rolls Over You" – 2:55
"It's Only Everything" – 2:51
"Always Is the Same/Shine On" – 6:30 
"Here She Comes Again" – 2:15
"The Big Parade" – 2:57
"The Love You Give" – 3:09
"I Need You" – 2:37 
"Some Weekend Night" – 2:38
"The Way She Does" – 5:21

UK singles
"When This River Rolls Over You"
Release date: 4 August 2003
UK Chart: #32
7" (ECS142):
"When This River Rolls Over You"
"She Speaks of These Things"
CD (ECSCD142):
"When This River Rolls Over You"
"She Speaks of These Things"
"In So Many Ways"

"I Need You"
Release date: 13 October 2003
UK Chart: #39
7" (ECS146):
"I Need You"
"I Will Journey Home"
CD (ECSCD146):
"I Need You"
"I Will Journey Home"
"She Only Cares for Me"
CD (ECSCX146):
"I Need You"
"The Shape You're In"
"Still Water"
"I Need You" (music video)

"Here She Comes Again"
Release date: 9 February 2004
UK Chart:#25
7" (ECS148): 
"Here She Comes Again"
"How You Seem to Be"
CD (ECSCD148):
"Here She Comes Again"
"Stumbling Home"
CD (ECSCX148):
"Here She Comes Again"
"How You Seem to Be"
"All Years Leaving" (acoustic version)
"Here She Comes Again" (video)

"Outside Your Door"
Release Date: 24 May 2004
UK Chart:#49
7" (ECS151): 
"Outside Your Door"
"When This River Rolls Over You"
CD (ECSCD151):
"Outside Your Door"
"When This River Rolls Over You"
CD (ECSCX151):
"Outside Your Door"
"All That's Glass" (Home Recording)
"It Takes a While" (Home Recording)

Personnel 
 Howie Payne – guitar, vocals
 Steve Pilgrim – drums, backing vocals
 Luke Thomson – guitar, backing vocals
 Dean Ravera – bass guitar
 Noel Gallagher – guitar
 Bill Ryder Jones – piano
 Kevin Bacon – engineer, mixing
 Jonathan Quarmby – engineer, mixing
 Jan Stan Kybert – engineer
 Tom Sheehan – sleeve photo

References

2004 debut albums
Albums recorded at Wheeler End Studios
The Stands albums